George Higham  (born 1855) was a Welsh international footballer. He was part of the Wales national football team between 1878 and 1879, playing 2 matches. He played his first match on 23 March 1878 against Scotland and his last match on 18  January 1879 against England.

See also
 List of Wales international footballers (alphabetical)
 List of Wales international footballers born outside Wales

References

1855 births
Welsh footballers
Wales international footballers
Place of birth missing
Date of death missing
Association football defenders